Henry Andrews "Harry" Orr was a Canadian ice hockey defenseman who was an All-American for Cornell.

Career
Orr was a member of Ned Harkness' first recruiting class when he arrived at Cornell University in 1963. Orr began playing with the varsity team the following fall and provided an instant impact on the blue line, scoring 16 goals as a Sophomore and finishing third on the team in scoring. As a junior Orr's scoring decreased as he focused primarily on keeping the puck away from his goaltender and Cornell became a defensive powerhouse, surrendering just 54 goals in 27 games. Orr was named to the All-ECAC First Team and the team recorded 20 wins for the first time. Orr helped the team to a second-place finish in the ECAC Tournament and was named to the All-Tournament First Team. Due to a disagreement between the Ivy League and the NCAA, Cornell declined its invitation to the national tournament.

The dispute was eventually settled in the offseason and Orr entered his senior season with a chance to compete for a national title, something that Harkness had promised Orr years earlier. The team continued to be the best defensive club in the nation, this time allowing just 46 goals in 29 games, setting a host of NCAA records in the process and finishing the regular season with a 24–1–1 record. Orr was named as an All-American and the ECAC Most Outstanding Defenseman. He was instrumental in Cornell's march through the playoffs, winning the program's first ECAC Championship, and then surrendering just one goal in the NCAA Tournament. Orr was named to the All-Tournament First Teams for both championships and skated away as one of the all-time Cornell greats.

After graduating he played one year of professional hockey before retiring and embarking on a 30-year career in Ministry of Natural Resources. He was inducted into the Cornell Athletic Hall of Fame in 1984.

Harry Orr died in his sleep after a battle with cancer.

Career statistics

Regular season and playoffs

Awards and honors

References

External links

1944 births
2019 deaths
Deaths from cancer in Canada
Canadian ice hockey defencemen
Ice hockey people from Ontario
Sportspeople from Mississauga
Cornell Big Red men's ice hockey players
Port Huron Flags players
AHCA Division I men's ice hockey All-Americans
NCAA men's ice hockey national champions